Paolo Pininfarina (28 August 1958) is an Italian engineer, designer and businessman, known as the manager, since 2008, of the Pininfarina design company.

He  studied mechanical engineering at Politecnico di Torino before joining his father Sergio Pininfarina's firm in 1982, as a trainee stationed abroad with Cadillac and Honda (1983), and then as quality manager of the Cadillac Allanté project (1984–86) and program manager of the Engineering GM 200 at General Motors (1987–89) which led to Chevrolet Lumina APV, Oldsmobile Silhouette and Pontiac Trans Sport. Paolo Pininfarina became the first manager of the new  Pininfarina Extra S.r.l. (1987) which does design for non-automotive industries (furniture, appliances, maritime), while being in the upper management of the automobile firm as well (board member 1988, deputy chairman 2006) where he now is chairman (2008), succeeding his brother Andrea Pininfarina (1957-2008).

He has been member in the board of Turin's Istituto Europeo di Design (1996-2004) and is emeritus participating founder of the  Associazione per il Disegno Industriale of Milan.

References

Italian mechanical engineers
Italian chief executives
Italian designers
Pininfarina people
Polytechnic University of Turin alumni
Automotive engineers from Turin
1958 births
Living people
21st-century Italian engineers
20th-century Italian engineers